County Bank may refer to:

County Bank (China), a type of financial institution in the PRC
County NatWest, formerly County Bank, now NatWest Markets